Falling Angels may refer to:

 Falling Angels (film), a 2003 adaptation of the novel by Barbara Gowdy (see below)
 Falling Angels, a 2001 novel by Tracy Chevalier
 Falling Angels, a 1989 novel by Barbara Gowdy
 Falling Angels, a 1979 novel by K. M. Peyton
 Falling Angels, a 1989 ballet choreographed by Jiří Kylián

See also
 Falling Angel, a 1978 horror novel by William Hjortsberg
 Fallen Angels (disambiguation)
 Fallen angel (disambiguation)
 Angels Fall (disambiguation)